Lithium borate, also known as lithium tetraborate is an inorganic compound with the formula Li2B4O7. A colorless solid, lithium borate is used in making glasses and ceramics.

Structure
Its structure consists of a polymeric borate backbone.  The Li+ centers are bound to four and five oxygen ligands.  Boron centers are trigonal and tetrahedral.

Lithium borate can be used in the laboratory as LB buffer for gel electrophoresis of DNA and RNA.  It is also used in the borax fusion method to vitrify mineral powder specimens for analysis by WDXRF spectroscopy.

See also
LB buffer
Lithium metaborate (LiBO2)

References

Borates
Lithium compounds